, originally , and also known by the pseudonym Shisui, was a Japanese potter and painter.

Biography 
Ogata Kenzan was born in Kyoto into a rich merchant family. His older brother was the painter Ogata Kōrin (1658–1716). Kenzan studied with the potter Nonomura Ninsei and made his own kiln. In 1712 a nobleman began patronizing his kiln, he moved to the east area of Kyoto. He was one of the greatest ceramicists of the Tokugawa era. He is associated with Kyō ware. 
In 1713, he moved to Edo where he also spent the rest of his life.

Ogata Kenzan produced a distinctive style of freely brushed grasses, blossoms, and birds as decorative motifs for pottery. His pieces were noted for their perfect relation between design and shape. He often collaborated on the decoration of pottery with his older brother, Ogata Kōrin, after whom the style known as Rinpa was named.

Bernard Leach, the British studio potter, wrote a book about Ogata Kenzan in 1966 entitled Kenzan and his Tradition, published by Faber & Faber in London.

Gallery

External links

Ogata Kenzan - Jyuluck-Do Corporation
Pottery works by Ogata Kenzan
Bowl with bamboo leaf design at Kimball Art Museum

1663 births
1743 deaths
17th-century Japanese painters
18th-century Japanese painters
Japanese potters
Japanese lacquerware artists
People from Kyoto
Rinpa school